Kace may refer to:

 Ergys Kaçe (born 1993), Albanian football player
 Kace Bartley (born 1997), English squash player

See also
 KACE (disambiguation), various acronyms